Joaquim Alberto Ferreira Machado (born 9 October 1971), known as Quim Berto, is a Portuguese former professional footballer who played as a defender (right or left back), currently a manager.

Playing career
Quim Berto was born in Guimarães. Over 11 seasons, he amassed Primeira Liga totals of 238 matches and 18 goals in representation of Vitória SC, Sporting CP and Varzim SC. In the summer of 2001 he signed for S.L. Benfica but never appeared officially for the club, spending one year on loan to the latter side before joining permanently.

Additionally, Quim Berto made 186 second division appearances. In that level, in the 2003–04 campaign, he scored a career-best ten goals in 30 games for Varzim, mostly through his main asset, free kicks.

Coaching career
Quim Berto retired in June 2010 at nearly 39 years of age after spending four seasons with F.C. Vizela, the last in division three. On 27 July of the following year, he was appointed his last team's manager.

Hired at Varzim's reserves in 2014, Quim Berto took over the first team on 5 May 2015 when Vítor Paneira left the second-place side near the end of the season. He ended their four-year exile from the second tier with a 3–1 aggregate win against Casa Pia A.C. the following month; he was dismissed on 22 October, due to poor results.

Following his spell in Póvoa de Varzim, Quim Berto returned to the third division and brief stints with C.D. Trofense and S.C.U. Torreense. Between those jobs, he was briefly in charge of FC Lusitanos of Andorra, who were going through a financial crisis.

References

External links

1971 births
Living people
Sportspeople from Guimarães
Portuguese footballers
Association football defenders
Primeira Liga players
Liga Portugal 2 players
Segunda Divisão players
Vitória S.C. players
Sport Benfica e Castelo Branco players
Sporting CP footballers
S.L. Benfica footballers
Varzim S.C. players
C.F. Estrela da Amadora players
C.D. Santa Clara players
F.C. Vizela players
Portuguese football managers
Liga Portugal 2 managers
F.C. Vizela managers
Varzim S.C. managers
C.D. Trofense managers
Portuguese expatriate football managers
Expatriate football managers in Andorra
Portuguese expatriate sportspeople in Andorra